The Muskegon Area Intermediate School District serves the educational needs of school districts in Muskegon County, Michigan.

School districts
 Fruitport Community Schools
 Holton Public Schools
 Mona Shores Public Schools
 Montague Area Public Schools
 Muskegon Heights Public Schools
 Muskegon Public Schools
 North Muskegon Public Schools
 Oakridge Public Schools
 Orchard View Schools
 Ravenna District Schools
 Reeths-Puffer Public Schools
 Whitehall District Schools

Charter schools
 Three Oaks Academy
 Timberland Academy
 WayPoint Academy

Non-Public schools
 Calvary Christian School 
 Catholic Schools of Greater Muskegon 
 Grace Christian Academy
 Michigan Dunes Montessori 
 Muskegon Christian School
 St. Catherine's School 
 Seventh Day Adventist School 
 Western Michigan Christian High School 
 West Shore Lutheran

References

Intermediate school districts in Michigan
Education in Muskegon County, Michigan